Mai Tiến Thành (born 16 March 1986) is a Vietnamese footballer who plays as a winger for Vietnamese club FLC Thanh Hóa and the Vietnamese national team.

Thanh was chosen to play for Vietnam at 2007 Asian Cup and 2009 Southeast Asian Games in Laos.

In 2002, he was chosen to train with Leeds United for 2 months.

Club career

Return to Thanh Hóa
Tiến Thành signed a 2-year deal with his former club FLC Thanh Hóa in December 2015.

International career

International goals

Vietnam U-23

References

External links

1986 births
Living people
Vietnamese footballers
Association football midfielders
Vietnam international footballers
2007 AFC Asian Cup players
Thanh Hóa FC players
Becamex Binh Duong FC players
V.League 1 players
Vietnamese expatriate footballers
People from Thanh Hóa province
Southeast Asian Games silver medalists for Vietnam
Southeast Asian Games medalists in football
Vietnamese expatriate sportspeople in England
Expatriate footballers  in England
Competitors at the 2009 Southeast Asian Games
Competitors at the 2011 Southeast Asian Games